Māris Veršakovs (born 13 January 1986) is a Latvian handball player for italian team SSV Brixen Handball and the Latvian national team.
Māris Veršakovs is dating Dita Rozenberga
He represented Latvia at the 2020 European Men's Handball Championship.

References

External links

1986 births
Living people
Latvian male handball players
People from Dobele